The Imperial Constitution campaign was an initiative driven by radical democratic politicians in Germany in the mid-19th century that developed into the civil warlike fighting in several German states known also as the May Uprisings (Maiaufstände). These conflicts against the counter-revolutionaries began in May 1849 and varied in length and intensity depending on the region. Some lasted until July that year. They marked the end phase of the popular and nationalist March Revolution that had started a good year before in March 1848.

The Imperial Constitution campaign had as its goal the recognition of the Constitution of St. Paul's Church that had been put together by the first pan-German, democratically elected parliament, the Frankfurt Assembly. The campaign was triggered by the refusal of the imperial crown by Prussia's King Frederick William IV and the dissolution of the national assembly. Its parliamentarians then formed the so-called Rump Parliament for several weeks in Stuttgart, the capital of the Kingdom of Württemberg, until this assembly, too, was dissolved by force by Württemberg troops. The call for a campaign was supported by Georg Friedrich Kolb, Heinrich Herrmann Riemann and others.

In the wake of this call there were republicanist motivated uprisings, for example in the Kingdom of Saxony (May Uprising in Dresden), in the then Bavarian Palatinate (Palatine Uprising), in the Prussian provinces of Westphalia (1847 Iserlohn Uprising) and Rhineland (the Storming of the Zeughaus in Prüm and the Elberfeld Uprising of May 1849) and especially in the Grand Duchy of Baden (see Baden Revolution) where, for a short time, a republic was proclaimed.

With the military defeat of this last rebellion, primarily by Prussian troops, the March Revolution of 1848/1849 in the states of the German Confederation finally ended on 23 July 1849 with the capture of Rastatt Fortress, the last bastion of the Baden revolutionaries, by federal forces under Prussian leadership.

External links 

 Die deutsche Reichsverfassungskampagne by Friedrich Engels, written 1849/50,  full text, links to individual chapters at mlwerke.de

Frankfurt Parliament
German revolutions of 1848–1849